The Clue of the Screeching Owl is Volume 41 in the original The Hardy Boys Mystery Stories published by Grosset & Dunlap.

This book was written for the Stratemeyer Syndicate by James Buechler in 1962 while he was eighteen or nineteen years old.

Plot summary
When dogs and men suddenly disappear, and strange screams fill the night, fantastic stories of vengeful ghosts are almost believable. It is these strange happenings which bring Frank and Joe Hardy to the Pocono Mountains to help their father's friend, a retired police captain, solve the mystery of Black Hollow.

But when the Hardy Boys and Chet Morton arrive at Captain Thomas Maguire's cabin on the edge of the hollow, he has disappeared. In the woods the boys find only a few slim clues: a flashlight bearing the initials T.M., a few scraps of bright plaid cloth, and two empty shotgun shells which had been fired recently.

Frank and Joe are determined to find the captain, despite Chet's misgivings after a night of weird and terrifying screams. Neighbors of the missing man insist that the bloodcurdling cries are those of a legendary witch who stalks Black Hollow seeking vengeance.

Strangely, it is a small puppy that helps the boys disclose a most unusual and surprising set of circumstances, involving a mute boy, an elusive hermit, and a fearless puma trainer.

Television adaptation
This book was also adapted in 1977 as the episode "The Mystery of Witches Hollow" for the 1977 Hardy Boys/Nancy Drew Mysteries TV series.

References
Summary taken from 

The Hardy Boys books
1962 American novels
1962 children's books
Grosset & Dunlap books
Pocono Mountains
Novels set in Pennsylvania
Novels about missing people
Owls in culture